Oakmont Country Club is a country club in the eastern United States, located mostly in Plum with only a very small portion of the property located in Oakmont, suburbs of Pittsburgh in western Pennsylvania. Established  in 1903, its golf course is regarded as the "oldest top-ranked golf course in the United States."  It was designated a National Historic Landmark in 1987. The Pennsylvania Turnpike separates seven holes (2–8) from the rest of the course.

Oakmont's course
The course, the only design by Henry Fownes, opened  in 1903. With a crew of 150 men and a little under two dozen mule teams, Henry Fownes spent a year building Oakmont on old farmland, ideal for a links-style course. It straddles the Allegheny River Valley and uniquely has virtually no water hazards and, since 2007, almost no trees. With a USGA course rating of 77.5 and 175 bunkers, it is generally regarded in the golf community as one of the most difficult in the United States. It features large, extremely fast, and undulating greens.  All are original, but the 8th was moved several yards to the left to make way for the Pennsylvania Turnpike in the late 1940s. Originally a links course, trees were added in the 1950s-1960s. Most were removed beginning after the 1994 U.S. Open, with between 5,000 and 8,000 eliminated during a 2007 renovation alone. Greens are planted with Poa annua, and par for members is 71.

The course is also noted for its slope. In particular, on holes 1, 3, 10, and 12, the greens pitch away from the fairway.

One of Oakmont's most famous hazards is the Church Pews bunker that comes into play on the 3rd and 4th holes.

For many years, Oakmont's bunkers were groomed with a rake with wider than normal tines, creating deep furrows.  The rakes were last used in U.S. Open competition in 1962 and eliminated from the club in 1964.

Rankings
The course has been consistently ranked as one of the five best by Golf Digest 100 Greatest Golf Courses in America. In 2007 Oakmont was placed in 5th by the magazine.  It is one of only a few courses ranked every year in the top ten of the publication's history. The top 50 toughest courses ranks Oakmont also at number 5, while GolfLink.com ranks it at #3 overall.

Oakmont scorecard

A hole-by-hole course map from GOLF magazine (June 2007) can be viewed here 
Flyovers of the holes can be seen here

Major championships
Oakmont has hosted the U.S. Open nine times, more than any other course, most recently in 2016, and is scheduled for its tenth in 2025. It has also hosted three PGA Championships, five U.S. Amateurs, three NCAA Division I Men's Golf Championships, and two U.S. Women's Opens.  In total championships hosted (21) [need clarification - "championships" is not defined and the number of championships listed below is only 19], it also far outranks any other course [need citation].

U.S. Opens
Photo galleries of the U.S. Opens at Oakmont from the USGA's official site can be seen here

1927
The first U.S. Open at Oakmont was won by Tommy Armour, who defeated Harry Cooper in an 18-hole Friday playoff. The average score for the field was 78.6 (+ 6.6) and the field recorded just 2 rounds under par. The total purse of prize money was $800 ($ in  dollars).

1935
Won by Sam Parks Jr. at 11 strokes over par. The total purse of prize money was $5,000 ($ in  dollars) with a winner's share of $1,000 ($ in  dollars).

1953
Ben Hogan won the second of his three straight majors in 1953 at Oakmont by six strokes, coming in at five under par.

Scheduling conflicts made it impossible to win all four majors that year, as the late rounds of the PGA Championship, then a match play event, and the mandatory 36-hole qualifier directly preceding the British Open overlapped in early July. Hogan won The Masters by five strokes and the British Open at Carnoustie by four strokes. The purse was $14,900 and the champion earned $5,000 ($ and $ in  dollars).

1962
At the 1962 U.S. Open, an up-and-coming 22-year-old named Jack Nicklaus defeated the world's top player at the time, the 33-year-old Arnold Palmer, in a Sunday playoff round in Palmer's "backyard".

Both competitors had completed the 72 holes with a 283 (–1). It was the first professional victory for Nicklaus, and the first of his 18 professional majors. Palmer won the next major, the 1962 British Open, and his fourth Masters in 1964, but never another U.S. Open. The purse was $81,600 and the champion earned $17,500 ($ and $ in  dollars).

1973
Johnny Miller shot a final round 63 (–8) to set a record low score at a U.S. Open, and finished at 279 (–5) to win by one stroke in 1973.

Following an overnight rainstorm, Miller entered the final round in 12th place at three-over, six strokes behind the four co-leaders. Miller had carded a disappointing five-over 76 on Saturday, and his tee time on Sunday was about an hour ahead of the final pairing, which included Arnold Palmer.

Miller birdied the first four holes and hit all 18 greens in regulation, and used only 29 putts. Miller and four others were the only ones to break par during the final round in 1973. The purse was $219,400 and the champion earned $35,000 ($ and $ in  dollars).

Miller's low score (9 birdies with 1 bogey) led the USGA to set up the course at the following year's championship, now known as The Massacre at Winged Foot, in an extremely challenging manner; Hale Irwin's winning score in 1974 was seven strokes over par.

Johnny Miller's 63
Club selection and results - June 17, 1973

1983
In 1983, Larry Nelson was at 148 (+6) after the first two rounds. He then established the 36-hole record at the U.S. Open when he finished 65-67 to finish at 280 (–4), one stroke ahead of runner-up and defending champion Tom Watson. Nelson's two-round total of 132 (–10) broke the 51-year-old record by four shots, established by Gene Sarazen in 1932. Nelson's record, although not receiving level acclaim to Miller's 63 finish, stood until 2011 when Rory McIlroy broke it. The purse was $506,184 and the champion earned $72,000 ($ and $ in  dollars).

1994
In 1994, a 24-year-old Ernie Els outlasted Loren Roberts and Colin Montgomerie in another Monday playoff round to capture the U.S. Open, his first major and first victory in the U.S. It was the first three-way playoff at the U.S. Open since 1963.

The three in the playoff completed the four rounds at 279 (–5), but all were well over par early in the playoff round, played in oppressive heat and humidity, as temperatures approached . Montgomerie shot a 42 on the front nine, ending at 78 (+7) and was eliminated. However, Els and Roberts were tied at 3-over 74, with Roberts missing a short putt on the 18th hole to win outright, so they kept playing as a sudden-death playoff. On the second extra hole, Roberts bogeyed, and Els made par to win the championship. The purse was $1.75 million and the champion earned $320,000 ($ and $ in  dollars).

2007
Ángel Cabrera of Argentina shot 285 (+5) in 2007, one stroke ahead of runners-up Tiger Woods and Jim Furyk.

A course renovation had deepened the bunkers and removed over 4,000 trees that had been planted mostly in the 1960s, returning the course to its original links-style appearance. The average score for the field in 2007 was 75.72 (+ 5.72), with every hole averaging an over-par score. The field recorded just 8 rounds under par, only two per round. Cabrera had two of these sub-par rounds, shooting a 69 (-1) on Thursday and Sunday.

The total purse was $7.0 million and the champion earned $1.26 million ($ and $ in  dollars).

2016
The club hosted the U.S. Open for a record ninth time in 2016, and Dustin Johnson shot 276 (–4) to win his first major title by three strokes.

2025
Oakmont is scheduled to host its tenth U.S. Open in 2025, as announced by the USGA in June 2016.

Quotes from notable golfers
USGA Sr. Director of Rules and Competitions Mike Davis: "There's a reason [the U.S. Open is] coming back to Oakmont. This really is the gold standard for championship golf. It doesn't get any better than Oakmont."
Lee Trevino: "There's only one course in the country where you could step out right now — right now — and play the U.S. Open, and that's Oakmont."
Phil Mickelson: "It's really a neat, special place."
Johnny Miller: "It's probably the best course in the world . . . This is the greatest course I've ever played."
On Oakmont's greens:
Tiger Woods:"That golf course is going to be one of the toughest tests that we've ever played in a U.S. Open, especially if it's dry, it will be unreal because those greens are so severe."
Arnold Palmer: "You can hit 72 greens [in regulation] in the Open at Oakmont and not come close to winning."
Rocco Mediate said of the greens that they are "almost impossible"
Sam Snead once quipped that he tried to mark his ball on one of Oakmont's greens but the coin slid off.
Lee Trevino claimed every time he two-putted at Oakmont, he knew he was passing somebody on the leader board.
Johnny Miller said that Oakmont's are the greatest greens for testing a player's ability to putt.
USGA Sr. Director Mike Davis: "[Oakmont's greens are the] scariest in golf."

Stimpmeter
The stimpmeter, a device for measuring the speed of greens, was developed by Edward Stimpson (1904–1985), an accomplished amateur player from Massachusetts, shortly after attending the 1935 U.S. Open at Oakmont.

See also

List of National Historic Landmarks in Pennsylvania
National Register of Historic Places listings in Allegheny County, Pennsylvania

References

Further reading

External links

USGA's series on "America's Toughest Course Part I"
U.S. Open video of all eight tournaments at Oakmont
U.S. Open.com –  2007 U.S. Open Fact Sheet
2007 U.S. Open – course statistics – all rounds
Oakmont Guide at GolfClubAtlas.com
GCSAA.org – superintendents' fact sheet – 2007 U.S. Open
Description of Oakmont's clubhouse

National Historic Landmarks in Pennsylvania
National Register of Historic Places in Allegheny County, Pennsylvania
Golf clubs and courses in Pennsylvania
Sports venues in Pittsburgh
Sports venues completed in 1903
Buildings and structures in Allegheny County, Pennsylvania
Buildings and structures completed in 1903
Tudor Revival architecture in Pennsylvania
Pittsburgh History & Landmarks Foundation Historic Landmarks
1903 establishments in Pennsylvania
Sports venues on the National Register of Historic Places in Pennsylvania
Golf clubs and courses on the National Register of Historic Places